The 2011 AFC Beach Soccer Championship was a continental beach soccer tournament, which took place from February 27 to March 4, 2011, in Muscat, Oman, seeing the tournament leave Dubai for the first time. Beach Soccer Worldwide and FIFA decided to move the location of the championship to the Al-Musannah Sports City complex in Muscat, due to the success of the 2010 Asian Beach Games held there.

The two finalists and the third place play-off winner earned qualification to represent Asia at the 2011 FIFA Beach Soccer World Cup in Ravenna, Italy being Japan, who won the championship for a second consecutive time, Oman who finished in second place, qualifying to the world cup for the first time and Iran who beat the United Arab Emirates in the third place play off, to qualify by finishing in third place for the fourth time.

Participating teams
A tournament record 11 teams, an increase of four teams following the seven that participated in the 2009 qualifiers confirmed their participation in the competition, with many newcomers, showing the ever growing popularity of the sport.

 
 
 
 
 
 

 
 
 
 
 

Originally, 15 teams were going to take part, which included Afghanistan, Palestine, Qatar and Yemen. However, the four countries pulled out of the tournament because of an undisclosed reason.

Group stage
The draw to divide the eleven teams into the following three groups was conducted on 24 February 2011. The group stage commenced on 27 February 2011 and consisted of each nation playing each other once in a single round-robin format. To qualify for the quarter finals, a team must have finished in the top two of each group or have one of the two best records of the third placed group finishers.

All kickoff times are listed as Omani local time (UTC+4).

Group A

Group B

Group C

Third placed teams
Because some groups contain four teams and some three, matches against the fourth-placed team in each group are not included in this ranking.

Knockout stage

Quarter finals

Semi finals

Third place play off

Final

Winners

Awards

Top scorers

8 goals
 Takeshi Kawaharazuka
 Ishaq Al-Mas
7 goals
 Hussein Jabbar
 Shusei Yamauchi
 Ali Hassan Karim
6 goals
 Yahya Al-Araimi
 Jamoliddin Sharipov
5 goals
 Rashed Jamal
 Mohammad Ahmadzadeh
 Jalal Al-Sinani
 Rashid Ahmed Hassan
4 goals
 Han Xue
 Mehdi Hassani
 Moslem Mesigar
 Khaild Al-Zaabi
 Adel Ranjabar
3 goals
 Gui Qixuan
 Farid Boloukbashi
 Ali Naderi

3 goals (cont.)
 Omar Al-Jaser
 Abdulwahhab Al-Safi
 Youssef Al-Saqer
 Yaqoob Al-Alawi
2 goals
 Mohamed Darwish
 Ebrahim Hasan
 Yaqoob Nesuf
 Talal Yousef
 Qiu Hao
 Hassan Abdollahi
 Farough Dara
 Sadeq Jabr
 Takashi Arakaki
 Hirofumi Oda
 Teruki Tabata
 Haitham Al-Araimi
 Mohammad Nassif
 Javlon Anorov
 Fakhriddin Samegov
 Abdusattor Sattorov
1 goal
 Yilihanmu Aihaiti
 Gede Darmasuta
 Dewa Kadek Dwipayudha

1 goal (cont.)
 Nyoman Jumada
 Komang Kariana
 Wayan Metrajaya
 Juli Parimawan
 Moshtak Kadhim
 Kunihiro Wakabayashi
 Abdulaziz Al-Eid
 Hani Al-Dhabit
 Omar Akil
 Omar Al-Najjar
 Alaa Arnaout
 Ahmad Shatta
 Humaid Al-Balooshi
 Rami Al-Mesaabi
 Walid Mohammed
 Qambar Sadeqi
 Furkat Azizov
 Nodir Elibaev
Own goal
 Ishaq Al-Mas (for Kuwait)

Final standings

References
Day 1 Results
Day 2 Results
Day 3 Results and quarter final draw
Day 4 Quarter final Results

Beach Soccer Championship
2011
Qualification Afc
2011
2011 in beach soccer
Beach